Colin Defries (1884–1963) was an English racing driver and pilot who made his first powered aeroplane flight over Australia on 9 December 1909. He piloted a Wright Model A airplane approximately 100 yards (91 m), although the flight was not officially recognised. Defries managed to fly at height of about 15 ft (5 m) at a speed of about 36 mph. He then lost control and crashed, that led to the opinion that no controlled flight was achieved. With the Aerial League and a newspaper denying that the flight had occurred at all, Defries made a second attempt on 18 December. Finally, his mechanic, R. C. Banks, made an attempt of his own on 1 March 1910, and crashed the plane again.

Wing Commander Harry Cobby wrote in Aircraft in March 1938 that "the first aeroplane flight in the Southern Hemisphere was made in 1909 by Mr Colin Defries, a Londoner, at Victoria Park Racecourse, Sydney, in a Wilbur Wright aeroplane". Colin Defries was a trained pilot, having learnt to fly in Cannes, France. By modern standards his flight time was minimal, but in 1909 he had enough experience to become an instructor. He took it off, maintained straight and level flight, albeit briefly, and landed safely, on his first flight. His crash landing on his second flight demonstrated what a momentary lack of attention could cause while flying a Wright Model A.

Despite rival claims for aviators Fred Custance and Harry Houdini, whose historic flight was in fact certified by the Aerial League of Australia as the first, it is claimed by some Australian historians and the Aviation Historical Society of Australia that the definition of flight established by the Gorell Committee on behalf of the Aero Club of Great Britain dictates the acceptance of a flight or its rejection, giving Colin Defries credit as the first to make an aeroplane flight.

The owner of the aircraft, Lawrence Adamson, "dumped it at sea" in order to avoid paying customs duties. Most of the plane was lost, although the engine and two propellers were later salvaged. The engine now belongs to Museum Victoria, where it is regarded by the handler, David Crotty, as  "one of the most significant aeronautical artefacts" in the collection.

Personal
In 1940 Defries married the concert pianist Moura Lympany, a woman 32 years his junior. They divorced in 1950.

See also
 Harry Houdini: The Aviator — Houdini's flight at Diggers Rest, Friday, 18 March 1910.

References

Aviation pioneers
1884 births
1963 deaths